The hyrtioreticulins are a series of indole alkaloids, named hyrtioreticulin A through hyrtioreticulin F, that were isolated from Hyrtios reticulatus, an ocean sponge.

Chemical structures

References

Imidazoles
Heterocyclic compounds with 3 rings
Indole alkaloids
Carboxylic acids